In Darkness is a 2018 thriller film directed by Anthony Byrne and written by Byrne and Natalie Dormer. It stars Dormer, Ed Skrein, Emily Ratajkowski and Joely Richardson. The film was released on 25 May 2018 in the United States by Vertical Entertainment and on 6 July 2018 in the United Kingdom by Shear Entertainment.

Plot

Sofia McKendrick (Natalie Dormer) is a blind pianist who lives in an apartment in London, and is haunted by the murder of her family by Serbian paramilitaries. Her neighbor is Veronique (Emily Ratajkowski), the daughter of Serbian philanthropist Zoran Radic (Jan Bijvoet), who has committed war crimes during the Bosnian War, and currently suspected of running criminal organizations. Despite the controversy surrounding Veronique's family, Sofia appears to have an amicable relationship with her, although lately has been noticing something wrong with her. During a discussion in an elevator, Veronique slips Sofia a USB drive and tells her that the perfume is Liquid Gold. One night, Sofia overhears a struggle occurring in Veronique's room and witnesses Veronique fall to her death. Despite this, Sofia denies witnessing anything to the police Detective Mills (Neil Maskell), while discreetly holding the USB drive.

Later at an event hosted by Radic, Sofia performs and overhears Radic and his associates discussing the circumstances of Veronique's death, in the process revealing that he was the one behind it. Radic's head of security Alexandra Gordon (Joely Richardson) and her brother Marc (Ed Skrein) have a discreet conversation and it is revealed that Veronique was twelve weeks pregnant and that Marc was sent to kill her; it is also revealed that Marc was having an affair with her and is likely the father of her child. Radic forms a fixation on Sofia for her connection to Veronique, and Sofia ends up having to dodge police questions and Radic's men looking over Veronique's apartment.

Marc rescues Sofia from a rape attempt and later saves her from an attempted kidnapping and torture. Sofia spends some time with Marc and learns of his and Veronique's affair, and he explains to her that Veronique committed suicide out of paranoia. This in turn leads to an affair between Marc and Sofia. As it turns out Sofia has her own vendetta towards Radic, as she confides in her adopted father Niall (James Cosmo), and gives him the USB drive and reveals that Liquid Gold is the drive's password, which reveals Radic's assets and his criminal operations. Sofia recounts how while she was blind, she had a sister, Balma, who could see but would pretend to be blind for her sister's benefit. It's revealed that Sofia's family were once friends with Radic in Bosnia, but Radic betrayed her family and personally led the paramilitaries in the massacre of Sofia's family. Niall was a soldier who rescued and protected Sofia for years while she was planning revenge. In addition to this, it's discovered that Veronique has been planning to expose the truth of her father's crimes, but knew that her days were numbered; this was the reason she gave Sofia the USB drive.

Sofia learns that Alexandra is also looking for the USB drive, hoping to use the information to usurp Radic and his operations. Sofia hands Alexandra a copy of the drive in exchange for a private audience with Radic at Veronique's funeral. There, Sofia holds a blade to Radic's throat and he realizes the truth of Sofia's past and motives; Radic taunts Sofia by revealing he was in love with her mother, and that he raped her shortly before she gave birth to a daughter; Radic implies and is under the impression that Sofia is his biological daughter. Radic leaves the funeral as Sofia is emotionally devastated by these revelations. As Detective Mills looks into Sofia's past, it's also discovered that "Sofia" is an alias; the real Sofia was Niall's biological daughter who died in infancy, and Niall named Balma "Sofia" after taking her in. Niall soon passes away while in the hospital.

When Radic discovers Alexandra's treachery, and orders her to be killed; despite the appeal from his sister, Marc leaves Alexandra to die due to her indirect involvement with his unborn child's death. Radic drives to Sofia's apartment with the intent on personally killing her, while Marc rushes to her rescue. Meanwhile, Detective Mills is watching surveillance of Sofia's visit earlier in the front office and he notices Sofia looking at something. As he went to get coffee in the front office, he realizes she analyzed Marc's wanted poster and makes his way to her apartment. As a fight ensues, Marc takes out Radic's men, while Sofia initially holds her own despite her seeming disadvantage. Radic quickly gets the upper hand and prepares to kill Sofia, until Sofia reaches a piece of broken mirror and moves to impale Radic's neck with it.  However, just then Marc barges in and shoves Radic out the window. Radic falls onto a spiked fence, where he's impaled and dies.

As Sofia tends to Marc's wounds, there is a final revelation; Sofia was never blind and could see the whole time. Flashbacks show that during the massacre of her family, her blind sister was the one who was killed while they were hiding. Sofia, real name Balma, took her deceased sister's identity and feigned blindness for years. Because she could see, she saw a "Wanted Poster" and realizes that Marc is a wanted fugitive. The film ends as Marc encourages her to run, while he takes the fall for Radic's death, and Sofia flees the apartment.

Cast
 Natalie Dormer as Sofia McKendrick / Balma
 Lexie Benbow-Hart as young Sofia
 Ed Skrein as Marc Gordon
 Emily Ratajkowski as Veronique Radic
 Neil Maskell as Oscar Mills
 Jan Bijvoet as Zoran Radic
 James Cosmo as Niall McKendrick
 Ethan Cosmo as young Niall
 Joely Richardson as Alexandra Gordon
 Olegar Fedoro as Orthodox Priest
 Amber Anderson as Jane
 Hala Gorani as herself

Production
Sofia is depicted as living in Maida Vale, London, where scenes were shot for the film, including a flower shop on Lauderdale Road which was converted to act as a café. Sofia and Veronique's building is located in Bramham Gardens, Kensington. Other filming locations included Brompton Cemetery, Ealing Hospital, the Thames Embankment, New Zealand House and the National Gallery.

Release
In February 2018, Vertical Entertainment acquired US distribution rights to the film. The film was released on 25 May 2018 in the United States. In the United Kingdom, the film was released on 6 July 2018 by Shear Entertainment.

Reception

Box office
In the United Kingdom, the film grossed £1,550 in its opening week from 10 theaters.

Critical response
On Metacritic, it has a score of 59 out of 100 based on reviews from seven critics, indicating "mixed or average reviews".

The film, which features Dormer nude and contains a sex scene, has been criticised for what some critics called "gratuitous nudity". Dormer dismissed this in an interview with The Guardian, saying, "There has to be sexuality in the power play of a thriller. We have all got bodies, after all. In this film the sex scene, which for me was a love-making scene, is a metaphor for the way my character connects with the part played by Ed Skrein. Nakedness is a good equaliser and the shower scene also shows the tattoos on my character's body and makes it clear she is not quite who you think."

References

External links
 

2018 films
2018 independent films
2018 thriller films
American films about revenge
American independent films
American thriller films
British films about revenge
British independent films
British thriller films
Films about blind people
Films about pianos and pianists
Films set in London
Films shot in London
2010s English-language films
2010s American films
2010s British films